This is a list of original programmes broadcast on the Indian television Tamil channel Colors Tamil.

Currently broadcasts

Upcoming broadcast

Re-runs

Direct television premiere

Acquired programming 
 Golmaal Jr.
 Rudra: Boom Chik Chik Boom

Formerly broadcasts

Soap operas

Reality shows

 7up Thamizh Naattin Kural
 Enga Veetu Mapillai
 Colors Super Kids
 Dance VS Dance
 Dance VS Dance S2
 Arputhangal Aarambam
 Namma Ooru Coloru
 Anmigam Aridhadhum Ariyadhadum
 Kalai Dharisanam
 Colors Comedy Nights
 Singing Stars
 Mega Margizhi Isai Vizha
 Nalvazhi Selvom
 Kallapetti
 Kodeeswari
 Sinthanaigal Simplified
 Colors Kitchen
 Bhajan Samrat
 Colors Sunday Kondattam
 Kanni Theevu Ullasa Ulagam 2.O
 Pottikku Potti (2022)
 Vellum Thiramai (2022)

Dubbed series

 Appanae Appanae Pillaiyar Appanae
 Illaya Thalapathy
 Naanae Varuvaen
 Chakravarthy Ashokar
 Naagini
 Vetri Vinayagar
 Kaakum Deivam Kali
 Marubadiyum
 Sangadam Theerkum Saneeswaran
 Sandhya
 Srimad Bhagavatham
 Uthara Kandam
 Vanthathu Neeya
 Jay Shri Krishna
 Bommi Babl
 Meendum Man Vasanai
 Chandrakanta

Colors Tamil Youtube

 Ammuvin cholla Thudikkum Manasu
 Alaipayuthey
 Ajhagiya Laila
 Chakra Vyugam
 Uyirae Unakkaga
 Vaanavil

Animated series
 Baahubali: Makizhmathi Ragasiyam
 Kutty Anandhi

Awards shows
 Behindwoods Gold Medals
 Galatta Debut Awards 2018
 Suyasakthi Virudugal 2019
 Gallata Nakshatra Awards 2019
 Gallata Wonder Women Awards 2019

Special shows aired

2018

 Colors Tamil ithu namma ooru coloru (Channel Launching event)
 Isaiyodu Imman
 Navarathri Naatha Vaibavam
 Colors Tamil thiruvizha
 Yavum Isaiyae with Sean Roldan
 SPB live in concert
 Mettu Podu SPB
 Sid sriram unplugged

2019

 Ponggu Tamil
 Mellisai Mannarai ninaithale inikkum
 Hariharan Live in Singapore
 Engeyum Eppodhum SPB
 Namma ooru Thiruvizha (Kancheepuram Kondattam)
 Namma ooru Thiruvizha (Kadalur Kondattam)
 Mega Margazhi Isai Vizha
 Arputhangalin Aarambam
 Shri Venkateeswara Suprabatham
 Skantha sashti Kavasam
 Sarvam Isai Mayam
 Oh my Kadhale
 Naatama theerpa maathi sollu
 Kallapetti Diwali special
 Adiye Azhage
 Madai thiranthu chapter one
 Madai thiranthu chapter two

2020
 Aayirum Nilave Vaa

References

External links 
 Colors Tamil Official Facebook website

Lists of television series by network
Lists of Tamil-language television series